Toshio Iguchi from the National Institute of Information and Communications Technology, Tokyo, Japan was named Fellow of the Institute of Electrical and Electronics Engineers (IEEE) in 2014 for contributions to spaceborne meteorological instruments and radar.

References

Fellow Members of the IEEE
Living people
Year of birth missing (living people)
Place of birth missing (living people)